Hanzala Ibn Abi Amir or Ḥanẓala Ibn Abī ʿĀmir (Arabic: ﺣﻨﻈﻠـة ﺍﺑﻦ ﺍﺑﻲ ﻋﺎﻣﺮ) (c. 601625) was one of the companions of the Islamic prophet Muhammad. He belonged to the Banu Aus tribe of the Ansar. His father, Abu Aamir was said to be a Christian. Hanzala was just 24years old when he died in the Battle of Uhud while fighting against the polytheists. Hanzala, being a foot soldier, attacked Abu Sufyan ibn Harb's horse. However, Abu Sufyan ibn Harb was saved by Shaddād bin al-Aswad (also known as Ibn Sha'ub) who then killed Hanzala.

Hanzala had left for the battlefield to respond the call of Jihad leaving his wife Jamila, daughter of Abd-Allah ibn Ubayy, on the first wedding night. He did not have time carry out Ghusl (ablution). Muhammad is said to have seen angels giving Hanzala a bath in between heaven and earth with fresh rainwater kept in silver vessels. Because of this honour, Hanzala earned the title of Ghaseel al-Malāʾika (Arabic: غسيل الملائكة) or the one cleansed by the angels. His son, Abd Allah ibn Hanzala, would command the people of Medina in opposition to the Umayyad Caliph Yazid I.

References

Sahabah who participated in the battle of Uhud